The discography of Arsenio Rodríguez consists of numerous singles released between 1940 and 1956 by Victor, as well as LPs released between 1957 and 1970 by various labels. In addition, there are noncommercial recordings archived at the Center for Folklife Programs and Cultural Studies Archive, Smithsonian Institution.

The first author to elaborate a list including all of Rodríguez's official recordings was American ethnomusicologist David F. García, who published his work in a book entitled Arsenio Rodríguez and the Transnational Flows of Latin Popular Music (Temple University Press, 2006). The book was awarded the Certificate of Merit in the category Best Research in Folk, Ethnic, or World Music by the Association for Recorded Sound Collections in 2007. In addition, Cuban ethnomusicologist Cristóbal Díaz Ayala elaborated a similar list, largely based on García work, as part of his Encyclopedic Discography of Cuban Music 1925-1960 in the Diaz Ayala Cuban and Latin American Popular Music Collection.

Arsenio Rodríguez's recorded material can be divided into two eras. The first era comprises all songs recorded in Havana between 1940 and 1956, which were released as 78 rpm (and also 45 rpm) singles by Victor/RCA Victor. All these tracks except one ("Me quedé sin ti", 23-7000 B) were re-released as a 6-CD boxset in 2008 by the Spanish record label Tumbao Cuban Classics, which had also issued several compilations of this material in the 1990s. The second era comprises all recordings made by Rodríguez in New York between 1950 and 1970, the year of his death. His debut album, Montunos cubanos, was recorded for SMC (New York's Spanish Music Center) in 1950 (or 1953 according to other accounts).

Singles

As leader

As sideman

Studio albums

As leader

As sideman

Compilation albums

References

Further reading 

Arsenio Rodríguez. Discogs.
Arsenio Rodríguez. Rate Your Music.

Discographies of Cuban artists
Tropical music discographies